California Water Service, commonly known as Cal Water, is an American company providing drinking water and wastewater services to a number of regions within the state of California. It was founded in 1926 and is based in San Jose, California, and provides service across multiple local districts, reaching more than 484,900 customers.

In 1997, California Water Service formed a new parent holding company, California Water Service Group, in order to expand its service coverage into other regions and states. Shortly thereafter it made a major expansion into Southern California with the purchase of Dominguez Services Corp. for $53 million, incorporating its subsidiaries Antelope Valley Water Co. and Kern River Valley Water Co. into Cal Water's service districts.

Districts
Cal Water service areas are broken down into 23 districts:

Water Supplies
Cal Water districts employ a wide range of water sources, including surface water diversion, groundwater pumping, and purchase from other water suppliers such as the San Francisco Public Utilities Commission's regional water system.

In 2019, a plan for Cal Water's Chico District to purchase water supply from Paradise Irrigation District in the aftermath of the 2018 Camp Fire was cancelled in the study phase.

Treatment Facilities
Cal Water's Willows District installed in 2016 a treatment system to reduce hexavalent chromium in the local water supply using the first strong-base ion exchange treatment system of its type in the United States.

Weblinks

References

Water companies of the United States
Companies based in San Jose, California
American companies established in 1926